157th Infantry Division was an infantry division of the French Army during the First World War. One source says it was known as the Red Hand Division from a device on its Color.

Commanders 
 28/04/1915 - 15/09/1915:  General  Gillain
 .
 23/12/1915 - :  General Blazer
 23/05/1916:  General Brulard
 28/01/1917:  General Beaudemoulin
 04/05/1918 - Dissolution:  General Goybet

Order of battle

First World War 
 213th Infantry Regiment from March to November 1916
 214th Infantry Regiment from March 1917 to June 1918 (dissolution)
 252nd Infantry Regiment from March 1917 to June 1918 (dissolution)
 333rd Infantry Regiment from March 1917 to 20th december 1918
 401st Infantry Regiment from April 1915 to August 1916
 402nd Infantry Regiment from April 1915 to August 1916
 32nd Alpine Hunters Battalion from April 1915 to August 1916
 102nd Alpine Hunters Battalion from April 1915 to March 1916
 107th Battalion of Alpine Hunters from April 1915 to August 1916
 116th Alpine Hunters Battalion from April 1915 to March 1916
 53rd Territorial Infantry Regiment from March 1916 to ????
 70th territorial infantry regiment from August to November 1918
 99th Territorial Infantry Regiment from March to November 1916
 133rd Territorial Infantry Regiment from March 1916 to ????
 371st Infantry Regiment (United States) and 372nd Infantry Regiment (United States) (both from 93rd Infantry Division (United States)) from June to 20th December 1918

1915 
April 28 – September 23
 Established at the Camp of la Valbonne; stayed briefly and received instruction.
 From September 1, transported by rail  in the area of Liancourt; rest, instruction.
 From September 25, transported by rail in the areas of Châlons-sur-Marne, Saint-Hilaire-au-Temple.
September 27 – October 10
 Moved towards Saint-Hilaire-le-Grand.
 September 8–30 : entered into the Second Battle of Champagne: French assaults north of the Wacques farm.
 From September 30, held ready to intervene, towards Wacques farm.
October 10, 1915 – January 18, 1916
 Withdrawal from the front and transported by rail in the area of Belfort; rest.
 From October 29, rested and went towards Montbéliard and Héricourt.
 From December 26, worked on defensive organization while going towards Delle and Saint-Hippolyte.

1916 
January 18 – May 30
 Regrouped in the area of Delle, Montbéliard, then moved towards Dannemarie.
 From January 27, occupation of an area near Carlspach and Burnhaupt-le-Bas 
May 30, 1916 - March 19, 1917
 Occupation of a new area, further north, between Leimbach and the Rhone–Rhine Canal, forced to the right, December 1, until near Ammerzwiller.

1917 
March 19 – April 9
 Withdrawal from the front, moved towards Arches, through Mélisey, le Thillot and Rupt.
 From March 23, rest and instruction at the camp of Arches.
April 9 – June 16
 Moved towards the area of Belfort, through Remiremont, le Thillot and Montreux-Château; occupation of an area between the Swiss border and the Rhone-Rhine Canal.
June 16 – July 6
 Withdrawal from the battle; transported by rail from Belfort, to the area of Épernay; rest and instruction.
July 6 – November 20
 Moved towards Reims, and, from July 9, occupation of an area between Courcy and Loivre.
November 20 – December 9
 Withdrawal from the front ; rested near Damery.
December 9, 1917 – May 21, 1918
 Occupation of an area between Courcy and southern Godat, spread out to the right, March 31, 1918, until near Cavaliers de Courcy.

1918 
May 21–27
 Withdrawal from the front ; moved in stages towards the area of Fismes; rest et instruction, then moved toward the front.
May 27 – June 4
27 May 1918 : Second Battle of the Marne
 Entered into the Third Battle of the Aisne: resistance between Saint-Mard and Maizy by the German advancement, then withdrawal towards the Marne River; occupation of points of passage of this river, between Chézy and La Ferté-sous-Jouarre.
June 4–10
 Moved in stages towards Villenauxe; rest and instruction.
June 10 – July 13
 Transported in trucks to the area of Clermont-en-Argonne, then occupation of an area between l'Aire and the woods of Avocourt.
July 13–16
 Withdrawal from the front; rested near the farm of Grange-le-Comte.
July 16 - September 14
 Occupation of an area near the woods of Avocourt and west of Forges, spread out to the left, July 20, until the bridge of Quatre Enfants.
September 14–26
 Withdrawal from the front; moved in stages towards Vanault-les-Dames and Possesse; rested in the area of Valmy.
September 26 – October 8
 Moved towards the front.
 Entered, from September 28, on the banks of la Dormoise, into the Battle of Somme-Py (Battle of Champagne and Argonne): advanced until Monthois and Challerange.
October 8 – November 11
 Withdrawal from the front and rested near Valmy.
 From October 11, transported by rail towards Bruyères.
 From October 13, occupation of an area between the high valley of la Weiss and la Fave.

Annexations 
 Cut off from April 1915 to March 1916
 34th Army Corps, from March 1916 to November 1918

Second Army
June 10 – September 14, 1918
Fourth Army
September 26 – October 11, 1915
June 8–10, 1918
September 14 - October 11, 1918
Fifth Army
June 18, 1917 – March 29, 1918
Sixth Army
September 1–26, 1915
March 29 – June 8, 1918
Seventh Army
October 11, 1915 – June 18, 1917
October 11 – November 11, 1918

References

Infantry Division, 157th
Infantry divisions of France